"Crossroad" (stylized as crossroad on the release cover) is the forty-ninth single (fiftieth overall) by Japanese singer-songwriter Ayumi Hamasaki, released on September 22, 2010. The single is the second of a three-part project to celebrate the release of her fiftieth single L. The single is certified as a gold album by the RIAJ, for a shipment of more than 100,000.

Track listing

Charts

Oricon sales chart

References

External links
 

2010 singles
Ayumi Hamasaki songs
Songs written by Tetsuya Komuro
Songs written by Ayumi Hamasaki
Oricon Weekly number-one singles
2010 songs
Avex Trax singles